Mompha ochraceella is a moth of the family Momphidae found in Africa, Asia and Europe.

Description
The wingspan is 14–16 mm. The head is whitish-yellow ochreous. Forewings are yellow, suffusedly and irregularly irrorated with pale ferruginous; three darker scale-tufts above dorsum. Hindwings are whitish-yellowish. The larva is pale yellowish head pale brown.

Adults are on wing from May to August.

The larvae feed on willowherbs (Epilobium species), including great willowherb (Epilobium hirsutum). They mine the stems and later the leaves of their host plant. The leaf mine consists of a lower-surface blotch in a low growing leaf. The blotch is centered over the midrib and contains little or no frass. Pupation is within the mine.

Distribution
It is found in most of Europe, ranging (in the south) to Morocco and Asia Minor. In the east, the range extends to the Caucasus and Iran.

References

Momphidae
Leaf miners
Moths described in 1839
Moths of Africa
Moths of Asia
Moths of Europe
Taxa named by John Curtis